The Kansas Stars are an independent  baseball team based in Wichita, Kansas, in the United States. The Stars were formed in 2016 to take part in the 2016 National Baseball Congress World Series, which is not affiliated with Major League Baseball.

The Kansas Stars were started by ex-MLB players Adam Laroche and Nate Robertson and sponsored by the Kansas Star Casino.

The Stars finished third in the 2016 National Baseball Congress World Series, losing in the semifinals to the Hays Larks in 17 innings by a score of 9-6.  The Stars returned the following year and claimed the 2017 championship.

When playing, the majority of the Stars wear the uniform of one of the major league teams they played for but wear the Kansas Stars team cap.

The Stars announced in October of 2017 that they would not play in the 2018 NBC World Series.

Current roster

References

External links 
 Kansas Stars MLB Team Announced - NBC World Series
 Ex-MLB team, the Kansas Stars - Fox Sports

Amateur baseball teams in Kansas
Sports in Wichita, Kansas
2016 establishments in Kansas
Baseball teams established in 2016